Friedrich Gustav Maximilian Schreck (6 September 1879 – 20 February 1936), known professionally as Max Schreck, was a German actor, best known for his lead role as the vampire Count Orlok in the film Nosferatu (1922).

Early life
Max Schreck was born in Berlin-Friedenau, on 6 September 1879. Six years later, his father bought a house in the independent rural community of Friedenau, then part of the district of Teltow.

Schreck's father did not approve of his son's ever-growing enthusiasm for theater. His mother provided the boy with money, which he secretly used for acting lessons, although only after the death of his father did he attend drama school. After graduating, he traveled briefly across the country with poet and dramatist Demetrius Schrutz.

Schreck had engagements in Mulhouse, Meseritz, Speyer, Rudolstadt, Erfurt and Weissenfels, and his first extended stay at the Gera Theater. Greater engagements followed, especially in Frankfurt am Main. From there, he went to Berlin for Max Reinhardt and the Munich Kammerspiele for Otto Falckenberg.

Schreck received his training at the Berliner Staatstheater (State Theatre of Berlin), completing it in 1902. He made his stage début in Meseritz and Speyer, and then toured Germany for two years, appearing at theatres in Zittau, Erfurt, Bremen, Lucerne, Gera, and Frankfurt am Main. Schreck then joined Max Reinhardt's company of performers in Berlin. Many members of Reinhardt's troupe went on to make significant contributions to the German film industry.

Career

For three years between 1919 and 1922, Schreck appeared at the Munich Kammerspiele, including a role in the expressionist production of Bertolt Brecht's début,  (Drums in the Night) in which he played the "freakshow landlord" Glubb. During this time, he also worked on his first film The Mayor of Zalamea, adapted from a six-act play, for Decla Bioscop. In 1921, he was hired by Prana Film for its first and only production, Nosferatu (1922), an unlicensed adaptation of Bram Stoker's novel Dracula. The company declared itself bankrupt after the film was released to avoid paying copyright infringement costs to the author's widow, Florence Stoker. Schreck portrayed Count Orlok, a character analogous to Count Dracula.

While still in Munich, Schreck appeared in a 16-minute (one-reeler) slapstick, "surreal comedy" written by Bertolt Brecht with cabaret and stage actors Karl Valentin, Liesl Karlstadt, Erwin Faber, and Blandine Ebinger, entitled  (Mysteries of a Barbershop, 1923), directed by Erich Engel. Schreck appeared as a blind man in the film The Street (also 1923).

Schreck's second collaboration with Nosferatu director F. W. Murnau was the comedy  (The Grand Duke's Finances, 1924). Even Murnau did not hesitate to declare his contempt for the picture. In 1926, Schreck returned to the Kammerspiele in Munich and continued to act in films, his career surviving the advent of sound until 1936, when he died from heart failure.

Personal life

Schreck was married to actress Fanny Normann, who appeared in a few films, often credited as Fanny Schreck.

One of Schreck's contemporaries recalled that he was a loner with an unusual sense of humor and skill in playing grotesque characters. He also reported that he lived in "a remote and incorporeal world" and that he often spent time walking through forests.

There were rumours at the time of Nosferatu and for many years afterwards that Schreck did not actually exist and was a pseudonym for the well-known actor Alfred Abel.

Death
On 19 February 1936, Schreck had just played The Grand Inquisitor in the play , standing in for Will Dohm. That evening he felt unwell and the doctor sent him to the hospital where he died early the next morning of a heart attack. His obituary especially praised his lead role performance in Molière's play The Miser. He was buried on 14 March 1936 at Wilmersdorfer Waldfriedhof Stahnsdorf in Brandenburg.

Cultural references
The person and performance of Max Schreck in Nosferatu was fictionalized by actor Willem Dafoe in E. Elias Merhige's Shadow of the Vampire. In a secret history, Shadow posits that Schreck was a real vampire. Dafoe was nominated for the Academy Award for Best Supporting Actor for his portrayal of Schreck.

Scriptwriter Daniel Waters created the character Max Shreck (portrayed by Christopher Walken) for the Tim Burton film Batman Returns and compared him to the character Max Schreck played in Nosferatu. Variety claimed the name was an in-joke.

Schreck (as "Nosferatu") appeared in a SpongeBob SquarePants episode: Graveyard Shift.

Selected filmography
 The Mayor of Zalamea (1920) as Don Mendo
 The Story of Christine von Herre (1921) as Peter the domestic
 Nosferatu (1922) as Count Orlok
 Nathan the Wise (1922) as the Great Master of the Order of the Temple
 The Street (1923) as the blind man
 The Merchant of Venice (1923) as the Doge of Venice
 Dudu, a Human Destiny (1924)
 War in Peace (1925) as the apothecary
 The Pink Diamond (1926) as Watson
 Out of the Mist (1927)
 The Strange Case of Captain Ramper (1927)
 Doña Juana (1927) as Juana's father
 At the Edge of the World (1927) as Troedler
 Luther (1928) as Aleander
 Scampolo (1928) as the waiter
 Serenissimus and the Last Virgin (1928)
 The Republic of Flappers (1928)
 Volga Volga (1928)
 Modern Pirates (1928)
 Fight of the Tertia (1929)
 Ludwig II, King of Bavaria (1929)
 Boycott (1930)
 The Land of Smiles (1930)
 A Man with Heart (1932)
 Boo! (1932) as Dracula (archive footage)
 The Love Hotel (1933)
 A Woman Like You (1933)
 Must We Get Divorced? (1933)
 The Tunnel (1933)
 Knockout (1935)
 Donogoo Tonka (1936)
 The Last Four on Santa Cruz (1936)
 Graveyard Shift (2002) as Nosferatu (archive footage from Nosferatu)

See also
:Category:Nosferatu for images related to the film
:Category:Images of Max Schreck for articles and Wikipedia-hosted media related to Max Schreck

Notes

References

Further reading

 (summary of Eickhoff's biography/tribute of Schreck)

External links

Max Schreck, 1906 (Pinterest)

1879 births
1936 deaths
German male film actors
German military personnel of World War I
German male silent film actors
German male stage actors
Male actors from Berlin
People from the Province of Brandenburg
20th-century German male actors
People from Tempelhof-Schöneberg